The St. Mark's Church or  the Church of St. Mark is a Serbian Orthodox church located in the Tašmajdan park in Belgrade, Serbia, near the Parliament of Serbia. It was built in the Serbo-Byzantine style by the Krstić brothers, completed in 1940, on the site of a previous church dating to 1835. It is one of the largest churches in the country. There is a small Russian church next to St. Mark's.

History 

The church, dedicated to Holy Apostle and Evangelist Mark, was built in the Interwar period between 1931 and 1940 in the Tašmajdan Park, in the centre of Belgrade. It was built slightly north of a wooden 19th-century church that was destroyed in 1941.

Old church 

The original, wooden church, was built from 1835 to 1836, in the days of Belgrade Metropolitan Petar Jovanović (s. 1833–1859). The main donor was merchant Lazar Panča (d. 1831). Dedicated to St. Mark, it was built within an existing cemetery. It was a rectangular building whose exterior surface area was 11.5 by 21 m and whose interior was 7.75 by 17.46 m. At the same time Prince Miloš Obrenović, who was also a donor to this church, built the palatial church of the Holy Apostles Peter and Paul in Topčider (completed in 1834). Work on both churches was supervised by architect Nikola Živković (1792–1870). In 1838,  Prince Milan and bishop Gavrilo Popović of Šabac were buried directly by the church. After the May Coup, the royal couple, King Alexander Obrenović I and Queen Draga Obrenović, were buried in this church. In ca. 1870, the church was the parish seat of Terazije with 312 homes and Palilula with 318 homes. It was destroyed during World War I by Austrian troops, then reconstructed in 1917. It was badly damaged in the 1941 German bombing of Belgrade, being hit on Palm Sunday, 13 April 1941. The rubble was cleared in 1942.

New church 

Due to the rapid growth of the city and population increase, it became necessary in the beginning of the 20th century to build a larger church in the Belgrade quarter of Palilula. Frequent wars did not allow this until 1930 when a pair of Belgrade architects, the brothers Petar and Branko Krstić, both professors of the University of Belgrade Faculty of Architecture, designed the plans for the new St. Mark's Church. The present building of St. Mark's Church was built according to their drawings between 1931 and 1940. The outbreak of World War II interrupted the full completion of the church, especially of the interior. Only the construction work was finished. The foundation stone was laid on 8 May 1931, when it was also consecrated by Serbian Patriarch Varnava. The construction fully began in 1932 and the exterior was finished in 1939.

Divine service took place in the new church during the war in 1941 and after it until 14 November 1948 in the adapted narthex of the church. On that date the church was consecrated (by Serbian Patriarch Gavrilo V) and the church opened for divine service. There were plans to decorate the whole interior with frescoes. The external walls are in two colors of natural materials in the Serbo-Byzantine style. The church bell tower is a part of the church itself on the west side.

Due to the already urbanized area around it, the construction couldn't follow the strict church canon concerning the east-west position. In order to fit into the existing city grid, Patriarch Varnava gave a special permit for the new church to deviate for 10 degrees from the canonical rule. That way, the main entrance came in line with the Resavska Street, across it.

The Gračanica Monastery was used as a model for the new church. Until the Church of Saint Sava surpassed it, St.Mark's Church was the largest Serbian church. It is considered one of the most beautiful edifices of the sacral architecture in the Serbo-Byzantine Revival style.

More than seventy years after the beginning of its construction, St. Mark's Church has not been completed. This relates primarily to its interior, decorating, fresco painting, appropriate lighting, acoustics, heating, and ventilation. After World War II little was done in the church itself for objective reasons. Above the entrance door to the church on the external façade is an icon in a mosaic of the Holy Apostle and Evangelist Mark, the work of Veljko Stanojević in 1961. The floor in the church is from 1974, while the floor of the soleia (area in front of the iconostasis and the altar (sanctuary) was done in marble in 1991.

The Anniversary Day of Operation Storm, held for mourning killed and exiled Serbs from Croatia and Bosnia and Herzegovina, is held on August 5 in St. Mark's Church.

In November 2017 a complete rearrangement of the plateau, which functioned as an extension of the Tašmajdan Park in front of the church, began. Old asphalt pavement which served as a parking lot was removed. Architect Jovan Mitrović designed a new, leveled combination of granite slabs and green areas. The plateau will be divided in two sections, left and right, divided by the green island. The right, "ceremonial" side will be regularly shaped, with the granite slabs posted in the horizontal rhythm, interrupted with the thin squares of red Italian granite. The design is patterned after the façade of the Michelangelo's temples on Capitoline Hill in Rome. The idea is to visually expand the church. The left side will have "disheveled" pattern, made of differently sized and combined granite slabs. The plateau was finished in February 2018.

In June 2018 it was announced that a monument to Patriarch Pavle, head of the Serbian Orthodox Church from 1990 to 2009, will be erected on the green area between the newly finished plateau and the tram stop in Tašmajdan Park. It was placed in the park on 13 November 2018 and dedicated on 15 November, an anniversary of Pavle's death.

Characteristics

Exterior 

Interior 

The interiors of the church cover . The naos can receive 2,000 people and the choir gallery can accommodate 150 musicians. Because of the number of the worshipers it can receive, it was the largest Serbian Orthodox Church in Interbellum Yugoslavia.

The central iconostasis of the church, designed by architect and professor Zoran Petrović, dates back to 1992. It was done in marble, while the icons themselves are done in mosaic from 1996 to 1998, the work of painter Đuro Radlović. The mosaic represents  or "Mother of God, Larger than Heavens". Other representations are Communion of the Apostles, and Liturgists, which includes likes of Saint Sava, Saint Basil of Ostrog, Saint Nikolaj of Žiča, Saint Petar Zimonjić and Patriarch Pavle.

The iconostasis' mosaic also depicts the Annunciation. Usually, the Virgin Mary is represented doing some house work while the angel Gabriel announces to her she will became the mother of Jesus Christ through virgin birth, but here she is depicted as being visibly surprised by the notion that she will be the Mother of God.

This is believed to be the largest mosaic in any of the altar's apses in the world. Other themes on the mosaic are the Eucharist of the Apostles and representations of Saint Sava, Saint Basil of Ostrog, Saint Nikolaj of Ohrid and Žiča and Patriarch Pavle. Plans were made to fully paint the church's interior, which had bare walls for decades, partially by the mosaics, partially by the frescoes. It depicts Christ Enthroned, with two ethereal angels hovering above him. The mosaic is also done by Radlović, and made from the 8.5 million pieces of baked Venetian glass.

The church has three altars. The altar table is also in marble with smaller mosaics on the front side. To the right of the altar is a smaller altar dedicated to the Holy Despot Stefan Lazarević (d. 1427), and the altar on the north side is dedicated to the feast day of the Transfiguration of the Lord.

As one enters the church on the right side along the south wall of the church is the marble tomb of Emperor Stefan Dušan (r. 1331–55), designed by Dragomir Tadić. The emperor was originally buried in his endowment, the Monastery of the Holy Archangels near Prizren. The monastery laid in ruins for centuries. During the survey of the locality in 1927, historian  discovered emperor's relics. He transported them to Skopje, and then handed them over to the Building of the Patriarchate in Belgrade. The relics rested there until 19 May 1968, when they were relocated to the St.Mark's Church.  On the opposite, north side the tomb of Serbian Patriarch German (d. 1991) has been built in the same style and of the same material. There are mosaics above the emperor's and patriarch's tombs, done by Đuro Radlević: "Crowning of emperor Dušan", and "Eye of Providence", respectively.

Inside is also a  heavy beehive in the form of the scale model of the church. In the middle of the church underneath the central cupola is apolielei, a wheel chandelier, done in copper according to the design of Dragomir Tadić in 1969, and executed by academic sculptor Dragutin Petrović.

Below the narthex of the church is the crypt which was adapted during 2007. It is installed new ground marble, climatization, and ventilation, sound system, and graves were readopted. In it are several tombs transferred from the original church: Metropolitan Teodosije (1815–1892), Bishop Viktor of Niš (1797–1888), Bishop Gavrilo (Popović, 1811-1871) of Šabac, and Bishop Mojsije of Timok (1835–1896). Also interred here are King Alexander Obrenović and Queen Draga (†1903), Ana Jovana Obrenović (†1880), Princes Milan M. Obrenović (1819–1839) and Sergije M. Obrenović († 1878), and the grave of the patron endower of the old church, Lazar Panča.

In general, the entire space of the very large crypt is little used and suitable for a gallery, museum or display area. The church treasury is presently located in a room on the south side and contains a rich collection of icons and precious artifacts. The most valuable icons are Theotokos with Christ from the 16th century; Jesus Christ on the Throne, an icon from the end of the 18th century; St. Nicholas on the Throne, Holy Emperor Constantine and Empress Helen, an icon from the first half of the 19th century; St. Demetrios and St. George, an icon from 1849; Theotokos with the Saints, an icon from the first half of the 19th century; St. George and St. Demetrios, an icon from the mid-19th century; Crowning of the Most Holy Theotokos, an icon from the mid-19th century; Holy Emperor Constantine and Empress Helen (Exaltation of the Honorable Cross), an icon from the mid-19th century; Theotokos with Christ, the Holy Prophet Daniel and St. John the Baptist, an icon from 1863; Theotokos of Arabia, an icon from 1872; St. Sava of Serbia, an icon from 1870; Holy King Stefan of Dečani, an icon from 1883; Holy Apostle and Evangelist Mark, an icon from the end of the 19th century; Holy Archangel Michael, an icon from 1889; the Pilgrims' icon (the Theotokos, Jesus Christ, the apostles, the Final Judgment), an icon from the end of the 19th century; St. George Killing the Dragon, an icon from 1926; and many other icons.

The icons are primarily the work of eminent painters and icon painters of the 19th and 20th centuries: Steva Todorović, Nikola Marković, Dimitrije Posniković, Vladimir Vojnović, Pavle Čortanović, Lukijan Bibić, Vasa Pomorišac, Đorđe Popović, Olga Krdžalić and others. The 16th century icon of Virgin Hodegetria is believed to be the second oldest icon preserved in Belgrade.

Other burials 

Alexander I of Serbia and Draga Mašin (Queen Draga)

References

External links 

 
 Belgrade Church Architecture

Serbian Orthodox churches in Belgrade
Serbian Orthodox church buildings in Serbia
Churches completed in 1940
20th-century Serbian Orthodox church buildings
Byzantine Revival architecture in Serbia
Church buildings with domes
Palilula, Belgrade
Mark's
Mark's